Anti-Fairy may refer to:
 Anti-Fairies, villain characters in The Fairly OddParents
 Anti-fairy tale, a fairy tale that has a tragic ending